Henry IX may refer to:

People
 Henry IX, Duke of Bavaria (1075–1126), also called the Black
 Henry IX of Lubin (1369 – between 1419 and 1420)
 Henryk IX Starszy (c. 1389 – 1467), Duke of Żagań-Głogó
 Henry Frederick, Prince of Wales (1594–1612), the "would-be" King Henry IX
 Henry Benedict Stuart (1725–1807), Jacobite claimant to the throne of England, Scotland and Ireland
 Henry Dundas, 1st Viscount Melville (1742–1811), nicknamed "Henry IX" for his personal power in Scotland

Fictional characters
 Ruler of the United Kingdom in the 2003 Martin Amis novel Yellow Dog
 Son of Henry VIII and king of England in the 1976 Kingsley Amis novel The Alteration
 Ruling monarch of a Nazi-occupied Britain in the 2003 Harry Turtledove novel In the Presence of Mine Enemies
 An illegitimate son of Queen Elizabeth I in the Japanese anime television series Code Geass

Other uses
 Henry IX (TV series), British television sitcom

See also 
 Henry, Duke of Cornwall, who would have been Henry IX